John Hartland (2 January 1862 – 8 February 1918) was a New Zealand cricketer. He played in five first-class matches for Canterbury from 1877 to 1891.

See also
 List of Canterbury representative cricketers

References

External links
 

1862 births
1918 deaths
New Zealand cricketers
Canterbury cricketers
Cricketers from Christchurch